Valeriy Oleksandrovych Vorobyov (born 14 January 1970) is a Ukrainian former professional football player. For several years since 1997 when he joined FC Torpedo Moscow he played in Russia where he later ended his playing career. Before that he played for Dynamo Kyiv, FC Arsenal Kyiv, FC Vorskla Poltava, FC Kryvbas Kryvyi Rih, FC Dnipro Dnipropetrovsk, and FC Shakhtar Pavlohrad.

Honours
 Ukrainian Premier League champion: 1995.
 Russian Premier League bronze: 2000.

European club competitions
With FC Torpedo Moscow.

 1997 UEFA Intertoto Cup: 6 games.
 2000–01 UEFA Cup: 1 game.
 2003–04 UEFA Cup: 2 games.

External links
Listed in the roster for FC Torpedo Moscow
Profile on ukrsoccerhistory.com
Included in the list of goalies with the most shootouts

1970 births
Living people
Footballers from Dnipro
Ukrainian footballers
Association football goalkeepers
Ukraine international footballers
FC Dnipro players
FC Vorskla Poltava players
FC Kryvbas Kryvyi Rih players
FC Dynamo Kyiv players
FC Arsenal Kyiv players
FC Torpedo Moscow players
FC Torpedo-2 players
Russian Premier League players
Ukrainian Premier League players